Claire Démar (1799–1833), was a feminist, journalist and writer, member of the Saint-Simonian movement. The  avant-garde nature of her  writings has led to her current recognition.

Her biography remains obscure. Her name according to some sources is    Émilie d'Eymard:   she     signed  her first letters as  Émilie d'Eymard but her first publications as  Claire Démar. Her  birth date of 1799 is also uncertain,  She died in 1833. Her father may have been the pianist and composer of German origins Sebastian Demar, with her mother being Elisabeth Riesam, also of German origin . They had settled in Orléans in 1791, but apparently no birth was recorded in that city's  vital statistics  for the year 1799 (Year VII-Year VIII, nor in the corresponding decennial table). The couple's daughter named Demar Theresia (Thérèse), harpist and composer (who was her elder sister) was born in Gernsbach, (Germany) in 1786.

Démar was one of the most combative women of Saint-Simonian movement. She used the Saint-Simonian movement to go further and express findings and claims that were rejected by a majority of her contemporaries, but became accepted by feminists during following years. Shortly before her death, she published a Appel d'une femme au peuple sur l'affranchissement de la femme   ("Appeal of a woman to the people on the enfranchisement of women")  which calls for the application to women of the Declaration of the Rights of Man and of the Citizen. She also describes marriage as legalized prostitution.

During the last years of her short life, Claire Demar participated in feminist journals created during the opportunity offered by the revolution of 1830,  She became associated with  the feminist  journalist  Suzanne Voilquin  in her publications La femme nouvelle,  L'Apostolat des femmes, et La Tribune des femmes.
 
Démar was preparing to  publish a second book, she committed suicide with her lover Perret Desessarts. They were found on the same bed with two letters and a roll of paper, which she had asked to be read in the Saint-Simonian society of Paris and then given to  Barthélemy Prosper Enfantin, who sent the papers to Suzanne Voilquin who published them in La Tribune  des femmes.

Publications
Claire Demar Appel d'une femme au peuple sur l'affranchissement de la femme,1833, Valentin Pelosse, 2001.
Claire Demar,  Ma Loi d'avenir posthumously in  La Tribune des femmes, Suzanne Voilquin, Paris, 1834.
Claire Demar (and Perret Desessarts), letters to Charles Lambert (3 August 1833), autographs stored at the Arsenal, Mss 7714, farewell letters written some hours before the suicide of the two lovers.

Bibliography 
Revue de Paris  1834, p. 6 et 7  
Suzanne Voilquin, Souvenirs d'une fille du peuple, ou La Saint-simonienne en égypte, 1866, Maspero, Paris, 1978.  
Ghenia Avril de Sainte-Croix, Le Féminisme, Paris, Giard & Brière, 1907.
Laure Adler, À l'aube du féminisme, les premières journalistes : 1830-1850, Paris, Payot, 1979.
Carole Bitoun, La Révolte au féminin. De 1789 à nos jours, Hugo & Cie, 2007.

References

1790s births
1833 deaths
French journalists
French socialists
French feminist writers
People from Loiret
Saint-Simonists
French socialist feminists